Arbieto Municipality is the third municipal section of the Esteban Arce Province in the Cochabamba Department, Bolivia. Its seat is Arbieto. At the time of census 2001 the municipality had 9,438 inhabitants.

Subdivision 
Arbieto Municipality is divided into three cantons.

References

External links 
 Map of Esteban Arce Province

Municipalities of the Cochabamba Department